Betagi is an upazila of Barguna District in the Division of Barisal, Bangladesh.

Geography
It has 22,156 households and a total area of 167.75 km2.

Demographics
According to the 1991 Bangladesh census, Betagi had a population of 110,926. Males constitute 49.95% of the population, and females 50.05%. The population aged 18 or over was 57,885. Betagi had an average literacy rate of 87% (7+ years), compared to the national average of 72.4%.

Administration
Betagi Upazila is divided into Betagi Municipality and seven union parishads: Betagi, Bibichini, Buramazumdar, Hosnabad, Kazirabad, Mokamia, and Sarishamuri. The union parishads are subdivided into 59 mauzas and 73 villages.

Betagi Municipality is subdivided into 9 wards and 9 mahallas.

Education

Primary schools 

 Betagi model government primary school

High schools 

 Betagi Government Pilot High school

Colleges 

 Betagi government degree college

Transport
Numerous rivers and canals force the inhabitants to use boats as one of the main transportation source. People use launch for long-distance travel. Road communication has improved significantly over the last decades. Although, travel on bus for long distance is not comfortable yet.

Economy
Economy mainly depends on farming. Although, people from Betagi Pourosova do non-farming jobs such as government employees, teachers, bankers etc.

Notable people
Shahjada Abdul Malek Khan, former MP in Patuakhali

See also 
Upazilas of Bangladesh
Districts of Bangladesh
Divisions of Bangladesh

References

Upazilas of Barguna District